Albert Ollivier (1915-1964) was a French historian, author, journalist, politician and member of the French resistance. He was born on 1 March 1915 in Paris and died there on 18 July 1964.

Biography 

After studying law and literature in Sorbonne, then in political sciences, Albert Ollivier started reading the Nouvelle Revue française. He became Gaston Gallimard's secretary in 1937. Enlisted in 1939, he later became a radio journalist alongside Claude Roy, but soon left the Vichy radio to join the ranks of the French Resistance. During the occupation, he worked on Combat, the clandestine newspaper of the Resistance, and participated in the Resistance radio movement with Maurice Bourdet and Pierre Schaeffer, preparing with this team of journalists the shows for the future "radio libre" (free radio) in a semi-secret Paris studio. He remained friends with André Malraux and Albert Camus, and did not resist the charisma of Charles de Gaulle.

Editor of Combat with Camus at the  1944 Liberation (he would later quit in 1945), Ollivier became a member of the first drafting committee Les Temps moderns, a journal created by Jean-Paul Satre.

1915 births
1964 deaths
20th-century French historians
French politicians
20th-century French journalists
Writers from Paris